Thiruchirappalli Govindarajulu Lingappa (22 August 1927 – 5 February 2000) was an Indian music director who worked predominantly in Kannada language films. He also worked in Tamil and Telugu movies. He was the son of G. Govindarajulu Naidu who was also a musician.

Early life
T.G. Lingappa was the second son and had learned music from his father G. Govindarajulu Naidu. His family stayed in Thiruchi. This is where M. K. Thyagaraja Bhagavathar (MKT) used to sing in their house and G. Govindarajulu Naidu introduced MKT to his children. G. Govindarajulu was a harmonium player in special dramas, but was also known as the one who taught music for K. B. Sundarambal. He also sold musical instruments and gramophone in Thiruchi, but the business was not doing very well. T. G. Lingappa had learned to play several musical instruments. In 1940, G. Govindarajulu Naidu took his family to Madras to look for greener pasture there.

Career life
At the age of 14, Lingappa tried to act in the film Kamathenu which was produced by Visvanathan. Instead Visvanathan had asked Lingappa to sing and to remain with him for sometime to given chance. He stayed a few months and when it is not fruitful and then moved on. Since he is able to play musical instruments, he then joined the Mayoora Film Orchestra and played harmonium, mandoline and guitar. This orchestra used to play music for films and gramophone. It sis to be noted that Lingappa played instruments for Ashok Kumar (1941) and he was earning salary of 30 monthly .

In the same year Lingappa approached Gemini Studios to try his luck. C. Ramchandra was working there with other older artistes. But Lingappa was rejected due to his young age. Not giving up, Lingappa proceeded to Salem to try his chance in Modern Theatres when music director T. A. Kalyanam invited him. There Lingappa met T. R. Pappa and K. V. Mahadevan. It was the time during the 1940s where everyone was circumambulating all available studios for opportunities.

In 1945, Lingappa returned to Madras and worked under R. Sudarsanam in the Pragathy Studios and he played instruments in the film Sri Valli (1945). Lingappa went to Karakkudi to play musical instruments when AVM Productions made Nam Iruvar (1947). In 1948, he returned to Madras and worked under C. R. Subburaman. All these experience under different renowned music directors had sparked an idea to be a freelance musician. He went on to purchase modern instruments from abroad, especially London where he bought the electric guitar. Lingappa was well capable of playing the guitar. Music directors G. Ramanathan, S. V. Venkatraman and K. V. Mahadevan had used Lingappa for several of their songs. From then on Lingappa was playing many instruments under all the leading music directors.

He worked with singers like T. M. Soundararajan, A. M. Rajah, Seerkazhi Govindarajan, V. N. Sundaram, S. C. Krishnan, M. L. Vasanthakumari, P. Leela, Jikki, T. V. Rathnam, A. P. Komala, Radha Jayalakshmi, Soolamangalam Rajalakshmi, K. Jamuna Rani, P. Susheela, K. Rani and S. Janaki.

The singing actors M. M. Dandapani Desikar, T. R. Mahalingam, K. R. Ramasamy, U. R. Jeevarathinam, N. S. Krishnan, T. A. Madhuram and J. P. Chandrababu also sang memorable songs under his compositions.

T. G. Lingappa and T. R. Mahalingam
T. R. Mahalingam had produced his first film Macha Regai (1950) where the music was done by C. R. Subburaman. His manager was B. R. Panthulu. Since C. R. Subburaman died suddenly, T. R. Mahalingam who had known Lingappa from earlier and became closer in the film Nam Iruvar, gave Lingappa chance to compose music for his second production Mohana Sundaram (1951). There are more than ten songs in Mohanasundaram. It was also that J. P. Chandrababu sang first Hello My dear Darling, Hello My rose charming. The success of the songs are due to T. R. Mahalingam and Lingappa both knew carnatic music, cooperated and discussed the tunes together. After that T. R. Mahalingam used Lingappa in his other movies like Chinna Durai and Vilayattu Bommai.

T. G. Lingappa and B. R. Panthulu
B. R. Panthulu separated from T. R. Mahalingam and started Padmini Pictures for which banner Lingappa composed most number of films in Tamil. The first film of B. R. Panthulu was Kalyanam Panniyum Brahmachari (1954), a Sivaji Ganesan starrer directed by P. Neelakantan. There are excellent songs in the film. The Bharathidasan song Vennilaavum Vaanum Pol was first sung by M. M. Dandapani Desikar in the stages. Lingappa obtained his permission to use the same song in Kalyanam Panniyum Brahmachaari with some modifications and after the approval of the tune by Baradidasan, Radha Jayalakshmi sang the song. V. N. Sundaram sang the comedy song Kaviyin Kanavil Vaazhum Oviyame in which he combines light music with carnatic tune. J. P. Chandrababu sang for Sivaji Jolly Life Jolly Life. This film and songs became hit. B. R. Panthulu again booked Lingappa for Sivaji Ganesan starrer Mudhal Thethi (1955).

Thangamalai Ragasiyam (1958) is another film that lifted P. Suseela to great heights. The song is Amuthai Pozhiyum Nilave. The same film was taken in Hindi and this song was retained with Hindi words.  Again it became a success in the Hindi circles.

Lingappa continued on composing for Sabaash Meena (1958), Engal Kudumbam Perisu (1958) and Kuzhandhaigal Kanda Kudiyarasu (1960). He then went on to compose in Kannada movies. After a break he came back to compose in Muradan Muthu (1964). That was the last film where B. R. Pantulu used Sivaji Ganesan.

However, Lingappa continued on working with Panthulu in many more Kannada films till the early 1970s. There were Malayalam films too.

The last collaboration was Kadavul Mama (1974) before the demise of Panthulu.

Works
Vaazhviley Oru Naal (1956) produced by T. S. Venkataswami who is the husband of U. R. Jeevarathinam. In this movie Lingappa there is a duet Thendrale Varaayo Inba Sugam Tharayo by T. M. Soundararajan and U. R. Jeevarathinam.

It is said by Lingappa himself that there are at least two songs that he composed, but came to be used by other music directors. One is Kunguma Poove which J. P. Chandrababu learnt under Lingappa and sang for S. M. Subbaiah Naidu in Maragatham (1959). The other is the song Putham Puthu Meni by Balamurali Krishna and P. Susheela in Subathinam.

Some compositions of T. G. Lingappa:
 Oh.. Jegamathil Inbam Thaan Varuvathu Ethanaale from Mohanasundaram by T. R. Mahalingam and S. Varalakshmi
 Paattu Venumaa from Mohanasundaram by T. R. Mahalingam
 Amuthai Pozhiyum Nilavey from Thangamalai Ragasiyam by P. Susheela
 Thendrale Varaayo Inba Sugam Tharayo from Vaazhviley Oru Naal by T. M. Soundararajan and U. R. Jeevarathinam
 Onnuley Irunthu 20 Varaikkum Kondattam from Mudhal Thethi by N. S. Krishnan
 Thunbam Varumbothu Nagaithiduvaai from Mudhal Thethi by M. M. Dandapani Desikar
 Vennilaavum Vaanum Pol from Kalyanam Panniyum Brahmachaari by Radha Jayalakshmi
 Kaviyin Kanavil Vaazhum Oviyame from Kalyanam Panniyum Brahmachaari by V. N. Sundaram
 Athimadhura Anuraga from Engal Kudumbam Perisu by A. M. Rajah and K. Jamuna Rani
 Radha Madhava Vinodha Radha from Engal Kudumbam Perisu by T. M. Soundararajan and P. Susheela
 Chithitram Pesuthadi from Shabash Meena by Soolamangalam Rajalakshmi
 En Arumai Kathalikku Vennilave from Ellorum Innattu Mannar by T. M. Soundararajan
 Asaiyil Oonjalil Adiduvom from Kuzhandaigal Kanda Kudiyarasu by Jikki and A. P. Komala
 Kadhal Ullam Kavarntha Neeye from Sangilithevan by T. M. Soundararajan and P. Leela

Filmography

Music director

 Rajayogam
 Yediyooru Siddalingeshwara Mahime

Playback singer

See also
Vijaya Bhaskar
M. Ranga Rao
G. K. Venkatesh
Rajan–Nagendra
Upendra Kumar

References

External links
Tamil article on T. G. Lingappa
Myriad Music Composers of the Last Century in My Movie Minutes

Indian male playback singers
Tamil film score composers
Kannada film score composers
Kannada playback singers
Tamil playback singers
Tamil singers
1927 births
2000 deaths
Musicians from Tiruchirappalli
20th-century Indian singers
Male film score composers
20th-century Indian male singers